Rashard Odomes (born December 21, 1996) is an American basketball player for Hapoel Gilboa Galil in the Israeli Basketball Premier League. He plays the guard and forward positions. He played college basketball at the University of Oklahoma.

Early life
As a child Odomes lived in Anchorage, Alaska, Copperas Cove, Texas, and Baltimore, Maryland. His mother Donna Stewart is a retired US Army first class sergeant.

Odomes attended Copperas Cove High School. As a sophomore, he was second-team all-district. As a junior, he averaged 26.8 points, 8.4 rebounds, 3.7 assists, and 2.3 steals per game while shooting .561% from the field, and was named the Texas 8-5A Offensive Player of the Year. As a senior he averaged 25.2 points, 12.4 rebounds, 4.8 assists, and 2.7 steals per game while shooting 58.3% from the field, and was a Texas Class 6-A All-State selection and the District 12-6A MVP. He ended his career as the high school's all-time leading scorer.

College career

Odomes played college basketball for the University of Oklahoma from 2015 to 2019, while majoring in human relations. In 2018-19 his .542 2-point field goal percentage was 10th-best in the Big-12. In college he was primarily known as a physical defensive player. In 2019, he was named Academic All-Big 12 First Team.

Professional career
In 2019–20, Odomes played for Umeå BSKT in the Swedish Basketligan. He averaged 16.4 points and 2.8 assists per game. In 2020–21, he played for Joensuun Kataja in the Finnish Korisliiga. Odomes averaged 18.2 points and 3.0 assists per game.

In 2021-22 he played for FC Porto Ferpinta, primarily in the Liga Portuguesa de Basquetebol. Odomes averaged 12.1 points and 1.6 assists per game.

In 2022-23 Odomes is playing for Hapoel Gilboa Galil in the Israeli Basketball Premier League, at the guard and forward positions.

References

External links
Twitter page
Instagram page

1996 births
Living people
American men's basketball players
African-American basketball players
American expatriate basketball people in Finland
American expatriate basketball people in Sweden
American expatriate basketball people in Portugal
American expatriate basketball people in Israel
Basketball players from Alaska
Basketball players from California
Basketball players from Texas
FC Porto basketball players
Guards (basketball)
Hapoel Gilboa Galil Elyon players
Israeli Basketball Premier League players
Sportspeople from Anchorage, Alaska
People from Copperas Cove, Texas
People from Baltimore
Oklahoma Sooners men's basketball players
21st-century African-American sportspeople